Jo Seong-hyeon (born July 5, 1983) better known as by his stage name Eru (Hangul: 이루), is an American-born South Korean singer and actor based in South Korea. His stage name Eru has the meaning that he would accomplish his dreams as a musician. Its  also a name that is made from Lee (李) which is the surname of his mother and lu (鏤), which means to inscribe his name on something.
He is known as "Indonesia's Prince," given his popularity in that country.

Biography
Eru was born Jo Seong-hyeon on July 5, 1983 in New York City, United States to South Korean parents. He is the second and youngest son of one of the most popular veteran South Korean trot singers, Tae Jin-ah.

Eru lived in New York until he was 7 years old, then his family moved to South Korea, where he attended numerous international schools including Seoul American High School. In 2003, Eru attended the prestigious Berklee College of Music (Piano Department) in Boston. Eru entered the K-Pop scene himself during a break from Berklee.

In late December 2007, Eru released a statement revealing his intentions of fulfilling his military service duties in the latter half of 2008, since he became a Korean citizen 2 years ago.

On May 1, 2008, Eru entered the boot camp to start his mandatory military service at Nonsan Military Training Center. Eru stayed there for four weeks to receive basic training and was subsequently assigned to public service duty. He completed his duty within two years, and returned home on May 27, 2010.

In addition to his singing activities, he was attending Dankook University.

Career

Pre-debut
Eru wanted to be a producer so he composed many songs. But after a while, he decided that he did not want other people to sing his songs. He wanted to sing them himself. He thought that the person who composes the songs understands them better. That's when he decided to become a singer.

Eru went through two years of training before making his debut as a singer in 2005. Eru's debut album included works from musicians such as Joo Young-hoon, Lee Hyun-jung (the composer of Big Mama's "Break Away"), and vocal trainer No Young Joo, who trained BoA, Fly to the Sky and Lee Soo-young.  A 100-member string orchestra also participated in his debut album.

Debut
Eru debuted with released his first single from his 1st album was "다시 태어나도" (""If I Was Reborn"") on September 5, 2005. Eru released his 2nd album Level II on September 16, 2006. The first single from his 2nd album, "까만안경" ("Black Glasses") which features singer Daylight, gained significant popularity among young people and topped on- and offline charts. The song would later be showered with numerous awards, including Jukeon's song of the month (October 2006) and SBS's Bonsang Award. After the huge success of "까만안경", Eru released his second single "흰눈" ("White Snow"), which he wrote himself. "흰눈" was also successful, reaching #1 on various online charts and winning several awards, including Cyworld's Song of the Month (January 2007). The music video for "흰눈" was shot in Sapporo, Japan and featured Eru and entertainer Lee Hyun-ji.  Aside from his own music videos, Eru appeared in female singer Magolpi's debut music video "Flight Girl", where his role was as a composer, along with six other Korean artists, including Yoochun of TVXQ, Kangin, Heechul and Shindong of Super Junior, Park Joon-hyung of g.o.d, and Kim Jang-hoon.
 
Eru released his 3rd album Eru Returns on September 19, 2007 and it became the #1 album during October 2007, selling 42,228 copies in South Korea.  The lead single from this album, "둘이라서" ("Because We Are Two"), enjoyed enormous popularity, winning SBS's Bonsang Award. The music video for this song featured celebrities Ahn Sung-ki, Bong Tae-gyu and Park Joong-hoon. Eru also released "겨울나기" ("Wintering") and "마네킹" ("Mannequin")" as singles from Eru Returns.  The star-studded music video cast for "겨울나기" included Eru, actresses Lee So-yeon and Kim Ja-ok, actor Park Sang-myun, trot singers Tae Jin-ah and Song Dae-kwan, comedians Lee Kyung-kyu and Ji Sang-ryeol, singer Kim Heung-gook, and others. His first solo concert took place on February 16, 2008 in South Korea.

Eru released a music video titled "White Tears," his single for his fourth album. His fourth album was released on August 23, 2010. In 2013, he collaborated with Indonesian comedian Sule in a multi-lingual music video titled "Saranghaeyo".

In 2017, Eru had a supporting role in the drama series You Are Too Much, where his character Park Hyun-Sung had increased screen time in later episodes, and he also sung the end credits song "Sad Love".

Scandal
In September 2010, Eru was accused by ex-girlfriend Choi Hee-jin, a song lyricist, that Eru's father, Tae Jin-ah, forced her to get an abortion after she became pregnant, and tried to give her US$2,000 that she claimed she didn't accept. She aired her claims on her Cyworld account. Choi was later arrested for online slander and blackmail of Tae Jin-ah and Eru.

Discography

Studio albums

Extended plays

Singles
2006: KBS Drama The Vineyard Man OST
2007: KBS Drama Capital Scandal OST
2008: SBS Drama First Wives' Club OST
2009: KBS Drama My Too Perfect Sons OST
2010: KBS Drama King of Baking, Kim Takgu OST
2011: KBS Drama I Believe in Love OST
2011: SBS Drama My Love By My Side OST
2011: SBS Drama Living in Style OST
2012: MBC Drama Rascal Sons OST
2013: KBS Drama Secret OST
2014: SBS Drama Temptation OST
2016: MBC Drama Blow Breeze OST
2017: MBC Drama You Are Too Much OST
2020: TV Chosun Drama Kingmaker: The Change of Destiny OST
2021: MBC Drama A Good Supper OST

Filmography

Television series

Awards

References

External links 

Eru at The Awesome Entertainment

Living people
1983 births
People who renounced United States citizenship
Berklee College of Music alumni
Dankook University alumni
K-pop singers
Korean-language singers of the United States
Singers from New York (state)
Seoul American High School alumni
South Korean composers
South Korean pianists
South Korean pop singers
South Korean rhythm and blues singers
Male pianists
21st-century American male singers
21st-century American singers
21st-century South Korean  male singers
21st-century pianists